

1975

External links
 Soviet films of 1975 at the Internet Movie Database

1975
Soviet
Films